Lt General Rahmatullah Raufi (born 1946 in Wardak Province, Afghanistan) is a former governor of Kandahar from August 2008 until he was sacked on December 4, 2008. Before that he was a senior military commander of the Afghan National Army presently commanding the 205th Corps, which is responsible for Afghanistan's restive southern provinces. He was the main Afghan commander of government forces in Operation Mountain Thrust.

He was replaced by Afghan-Canadian academic Tooryalai Wesa.

References 

Living people
Governors of Kandahar Province
Afghan military personnel
People from Maidan Wardak Province
1948 births